Dementia is a 2014 Filipino horror film directed by Perci Intalan, in his directorial debut. The film stars Nora Aunor as Mara, a woman faced with dementia encountering strange occurrences in her ancestral home. The film premiered on September 24, 2014, under Regal Films.

The film won Best Foreign Language Film and Aunor the Best Actress in a foreign language film at the 2015 St. Tropez International Film Festival.

Synopsis
In the hopes of helping her aunt Mara (Nora Aunor) better deal with her dementia, Rachel (Jasmine Curtis) moves her out to their family's remote ancestral home. There Rachel records Mara's daily activities and helps engage the older woman in exercises that would help her cognitive thinking, such as putting together jigsaw puzzles. What Rachel did not plan on is that Mara's presence in the house will stir up memories and presences that are better left undisturbed.  Mara and Rachel begin to see a ghost of Mara's past memories come alive.

Cast
Nora Aunor as Mara Fabre, a woman facing dementia
Bing Loyzaga as Elaine, Mara's younger cousin
Yul Servo as Rommel, as Elaine's husband.
Jasmine Curtis as Rachel, Mara's first cousin once removed, and Elaine's and Rommel's daughter
Jeric Gonzales as Vincent, a young neighbor
Chynna Ortaleza as Olivia
Althea Vega as a local healer and shaman
Lui Manansala as a faithful family retainer

Production
The principal photography for the film started on March 19, 2014, in Batanes. Scenes were primarily shot in Sabtang and some were shot in Basco. Most of the shooting the film were done in the day and seldom goes beyond sunset.

Awards and recognition

International

Local

See also
List of ghost films

References

External links
Test footage for Dementia

Philippine horror films
2010s Tagalog-language films
2014 horror films
Regal Entertainment films
2014 films
Films set in Batanes
Films shot in Batanes
2014 directorial debut films
Films directed by Perci Intalan